Logan Henry is a New Zealand rugby union player who plays for the  in Super Rugby. His playing position is halfback. He was named in the Hurricanes squad for Round 3 of the 2022 Super Rugby Pacific season. He was also a member of the  2021 Bunnings NPC squad.

References

External links
itsrugby.co.uk profile

New Zealand rugby union players
Living people
Rugby union scrum-halves
Manawatu rugby union players
Hurricanes (rugby union) players
1996 births